2012–13 WBFAL was the first edition of Women Basketball Friendship Adriatic League. Participated six teams from three countries, champion became the team of Budućnost Podgorica.

Team information

Regular season

Final four
Final Four to be played from 4–5 March 2013 in Igalo, Montenegro.

Awards
Top scorer: Ivona Matić of Ragusa

External links
News at website

2012-13
2012–13 in European women's basketball leagues
2012–13 in Bosnia and Herzegovina basketball
2012–13 in Croatian basketball
2012–13 in Montenegrin basketball